Orangeburg-Wilkinson High School is located in Orangeburg, South Carolina.

It is a part of the Orangeburg County School District. It is home to the Mighty Bruins/Bruinettes and also an International Baccalaureate World School.

History
Delano Middleton, a student at Wilkinson High School, was one of those killed in the Orangeburg Massacre.

Orangeburg-Wilkinson High School was formed with the merger of Orangeburg High School and Wilkinson High School in 1971.

Media appearances
In 2016, the school was featured in the six-part BBC documentary series Segregated America: A School in the South.

Notable alumni
 Shelton Benjamin, professional wrestler signed to the WWE, was a 2x NCAA wrestling All-American at the University of Minnesota
 Michael Hackett, professional basketball player
 Jaime Harrison, politician, chair of the South Carolina Democratic Party (2013–2017) and Democratic National Committee (2021–present)
 Mike O'Cain, American football coach
 Eugene Robinson, newspaper columnist and an associate editor of The Washington Post
 Mike Sharperson, MLB infielder and 2x World Series champion
 Herm Winningham, MLB player and 1990 World Series champion with the Cincinnati Reds

NFL players
 Donnie Abraham, NFL cornerback and Pro Bowl selection in 2000
 Alex Barron, NFL offensive tackle
 Woodrow Dantzler, NFL running back and safety
 Arturo Freeman, NFL safety
 Deveron Harper, NFL defensive back
 Dwayne Harper, NFL cornerback
 Albert Huggins, NFL defensive tackle, 2x CFP National Champion with Clemson
 Tim Jennings, NFL cornerback and 2x Pro Bowl selection 
 Maurice Kelly, NFL and Canadian Football League defensive back
 Max Runager, NFL punter and 2x Super Bowl champion, 
 Rusty Russell, NFL and Arena Football League offensive tackle
 Jonas Seawright, NFL defensive tackle

References

External links
 Official web site

Schools in Orangeburg County, South Carolina
Public high schools in South Carolina